Isoetes brevicula is a quillwort species native to Western Australia. Submerged in rock pools on granitic outcrops.

References

brevicula
Endemic flora of Western Australia
Plants described in 1984